Grays Prairie is a village in Kaufman County, Texas, United States. The population was 337 at the 2010 census.

Geography

Grays Prairie is located in southern Kaufman County at  (32.470592, –96.351171).

Demographics

As of the census of 2000, there were 296 people, 98 households, and 87 families residing in the village. The population density was 235.5 people per square mile (90.7/km2). There were 103 housing units at an average density of 81.9/sq mi (31.6/km2). The racial makeup of the village was 92.23% White, 2.03% African American, 0.68% Native American, 3.38% from other races, and 1.69% from two or more races. Hispanic or Latino of any race were 7.43% of the population.

There were 98 households, out of which 45.9% had children under the age of 18 living with them, 73.5% were married couples living together, 10.2% had a female householder with no husband present, and 11.2% were non-families. 5.1% of all households were made up of individuals, and 3.1% had someone living alone who was 65 years of age or older. The average household size was 3.02 and the average family size was 3.17.

In the village, the population was spread out, with 28.7% under the age of 18, 9.8% from 18 to 24, 30.4% from 25 to 44, 22.3% from 45 to 64, and 8.8% who were 65 years of age or older. The median age was 35 years. For every 100 females, there were 105.6 males. For every 100 females age 18 and over, there were 102.9 males.

The median income for a household in the village was $43,864, and the median income for a family was $44,722. Males had a median income of $36,000 versus $31,667 for females. The per capita income for the village was $17,529. None of the families and 1.5% of the population were living below the poverty line, including no under eighteens and 8.3% of those over 64.

Education 
Grays Prairie is served by the Scurry-Rosser Independent School District.

References

Dallas–Fort Worth metroplex
Villages in Kaufman County, Texas
Villages in Texas